This is a list of the National Register of Historic Places listings in Mount Rainier National Park.

This is intended to be a complete list of the properties and districts on the National Register of Historic Places in Mount Rainier National Park, Washington, United States.  The locations of National Register properties and districts for which the latitude and longitude coordinates are included below, may be seen in a Google map.

There are 44 properties and districts listed on the National Register in the park, four of which are National Historic Landmarks. The entire park has been designated a National Historic Landmark District.

Current listings 

|}

See also 
 National Register of Historic Places listings in Lewis County, Washington
 National Register of Historic Places listings in Pierce County, Washington
 List of National Historic Landmarks in Washington
 National Register of Historic Places listings in Washington

References 
Toothman, Stephanie; Begley, Susan; Carr, Ethan. National Register of Historic Places Multiple Property Documentation Form: Mount Rainier National Park. National Park Service 1996 

National Register of Historic Places in Washington (state)